Carly Dixon (born 27 July 1973) is an Australian former judoka who competed in the 1996 Summer Olympics, in the 2000 Summer Olympics, and in the 2004 Summer Olympics.  She has won nine gold medals at the Australian National Judo Championships.

References

1973 births
Living people
Australian female judoka
Olympic judoka of Australia
Judoka at the 1996 Summer Olympics
Judoka at the 2000 Summer Olympics
Judoka at the 2004 Summer Olympics
20th-century Australian women
21st-century Australian women